Nick Barnes (born 1964) is an English male former track cyclist.

Cycling career
Barnes was a British track champion after winning the British National Keirin Championships in 1991.

References

1964 births
British male cyclists
British track cyclists
Living people